Kandovan (also romanized as Kandovān and Kandavān; also known as Kanvān) is an ancient village in Sahand Rural District in the Central District of Osku County, East Azerbaijan Province, northwestern Iran. It is situated in the foothills of Mount Sahand, near the city of Osku. At the 2006 census, the village population was 601, in 168 families.

The village exemplifies manmade cliff dwellings which are still inhabited.  The troglodyte homes, excavated inside volcanic rocks similar to dwellings in the Turkish region of Cappadocia, are locally called Karaan. Karaans were cut into non-welded ignimbrites, also called "ash-flow tuffs," of Mount Sahand.  The cone form of the houses is the result of the erosion of ignimbrite layers consisting of porous, round and angular pumice together with other volcanic particles that were positioned in a grey, acidic matrix. During the eruption of Sahand, pyroclastic flows formed the rocks of Kandovan. Around the village the thickness of this formation exceeds  and with time, due to water erosion, the cone-shaped cliffs were formed.

Origin and stages of development
 
Mount Sahand is one of the most important mountains, the Silent volcano in Iran for one hundred and forty thousand years ago, After the retreat of Kandovan Lake basin, The stone of Kandovan has appeared.
There are several narrations about the causes of the emergence of the village:

The original inhabitants were nomads who had previously been Condon  this place was used as a summer house and houses dug inside the rocks, as a house they used it temporarily to reduce the hassle of moving later have settled there.

Primary residents of Kandovan village, residents of the ruined and ancient village was "Hilevar". Those times Mongol attack from this village, which is about two kilometers It is far from Kandovan, they had moved and lived in Kandovan .

In ancient times, some of the warriors from this place passed, due to the better military position of the place, Especially its topographic position that penetrates from above makes the domain impossible, use it as its own refuge they chose and started digging houses inside the rocks.

Gallery

References

External links
"Cones of Kandovan", JadidOnline.com

Populated places in Osku County
Underground cities